Luteone is a twenty-three carbon terpenoid from a sea slug, the dorid nudibranch Cadlina luteomarginata.

References 

Terpenes and terpenoids
Vinylidene compounds